Dr. Zulfiqar A. Bhutta  trained as a physician in Pakistan in the early stages of his career. He holds titles across various organizations in diverse geographies. Professor Bhutta is the Founding Director of the Center of Excellence in Women and Child Health & Institute for Global Child Health & Development, at the Aga Khan University South-Central Asia, East Africa & United Kingdom. He is currently the Co-Director at the Centre for Global Child Health, at the Hospital for Sick Children and leads many projects as a Senior Scientist at the Research Institute in the Centre for Global Child Health at Sick Kids. He holds a Professorship at the University of Toronto in the Department of Nutritional Sciences and the Division of Epidemiology, Dalla Lana School of Public Health. Additionally, he holds concurrent professorship at the Department of Paediatrics, Aga Khan University in Karachi, Pakistan and at the Schools of Public Health of Johns Hopkins University, Tufts University, Boston University, University of Alberta and the London School of Hygiene & Tropical Medicine. He is a designated Distinguished National Professor of the Government of Pakistan and was the Founding Chair of the National Research Ethics Committee of the Government of Pakistan from 2003 to 2014.

Early life and education
Bhutta received his MBBS from Khyber Medical College in Peshawar, Pakistan in 1977 at which time he was named "Best Graduate of the Year" and awarded the University Gold Medal for overall distinction. His PhD work was completed at Karolinska Institute in Stockholm, Sweden in 1996. He is a Fellow of the Royal College of Physicians (Edinburgh & London), the Royal College of Paediatrics and Child Health (London), American Academy of Paediatrics and the Pakistan Academy of Sciences.

Career
Following the completion of his bachelor degree, Bhutta began working as House Surgeon in Obstetrics & Gynecology at the Khyber Teaching Hospital, Peshawar (April–November 1978). He began work in paediatrics as a physician in November 1978 in the Professorial Unit at the Institute of Child Health, Jinnah Postgraduate Medical Centre, Karachi (Pakistan). Through 1980's he continued his work as a surgeon and paediatrician. He undertook his first professor position in the Department of Paediatrics, The Aga Khan University Hospital, Karachi (Pakistan), from November 1987 to June 1992.

In 2005, Bhutta became the Chairman of the Department of Paediatrics & Child Health at the Aga Khan University & Medical Center, a position held until 2008. Following his term as Chairman he became The Noordin Noormahomed Sheriff Professor & Founding Chair, Division of Women & Child Health, The Aga Khan University, a position he held for four years.

Bhutta currently holds the titles of co-director of the Centre for Global Child Health at the Hospital for Sick Children in Toronto, and founding director of the Centre of Excellence in Women and Child Health at the Aga Khan University. In 2020, he was appointed founding director of the Institute for Global child Health & Development at the Aga Khan University and elected Fellow to the Royal Society, United Kingdom.

Outside of his professional responsibilities Bhutta serves on various local and international boards and committees, including a series of editorial boards.

      

In his various capacities Bhutta has produced a large collection of publications working with his teams at Sick Kids, AKU and international partners. These include book reviews, chapters, and articles.

Since 2019, Bhutta has been a member of the Lancet–SIGHT Commission on Peaceful Societies Through Health and Gender Equality, chaired by Tarja Halonen.

In 2020, he served on “A future for the world’s children?”, a WHO-UNICEF-Lancet Commission, co-chaired by Helen Clark and Awa Coll-Seck.

Bhutta's research interests include newborn and child survival, maternal and child undernutrition and micronutrient deficiencies. He leads large research groups based in Toronto, Karachi and Nairobi with a special interest in research synthesis, scaling up evidence based interventions in community settings and implementation research in difficult circumstances and conflict settings. In particular, his work with community health workers and outreach services has influenced integrated maternal and newborn outreach programs for marginalized populations all over the world. His group's work with the WHO and PMNCH in developing consensus based essential interventions for women, children and adolescents is the dominant set of agreed interventions guiding global policy. Presently Professor Bhutta is leading two global academic consortia; one working on improving reproductive, maternal and child health in conflict settings and humanitarian emergencies and the other focused on integrated investments to improve child and adolescent health and nutrition across the 0–19 years life course.

Recognition
Bhutta was awarded the Ihsan Doğramacı Family Health Foundation Prize by World Health Organization in 2014, and Pride of Performance civil decoration by President of Pakistan Mamnoon Hussain in 2016.

Bhutta was a recipient of the TWAS Prize in 2016. He was elected a Foreign Member of the Royal Society in 2020. He was awarded the Roux prize for public health achievements in 2021.

He was awarded the John Dirks Canada Gairdner Global Health Award in 2022.

References 

Year of birth missing (living people)
Living people
Academics from Karachi
Pakistani paediatricians
Academic staff of the University of Toronto
Academic staff of Aga Khan University
Johns Hopkins University faculty
Tufts University faculty
Boston University faculty
Academic staff of the University of Alberta
Academics of the London School of Hygiene & Tropical Medicine
Khyber Medical College alumni
Karolinska Institute alumni
Members of the National Academy of Medicine
Fellows of the Royal College of Physicians
Pakistani emigrants to Canada
Recipients of the Pride of Performance
TWAS laureates
Fellows of the Royal Society
Ihsan Doğramacı Family Health Foundation Prize laureates
Date of birth missing (living people)